Nikolay Pavlovich Akimov (– 6 September 1968) was an experimental theatre director and scenic designer noted for his work with the Leningrad Comedy Theatre. His most notorious production was the cynical version of Hamlet (1932), with Ophelia as a drunken prostitute and the king's ghost as a clever mystification arranged by Hamlet. Akimov, who was the Comedy Theater director in 1935-1949 and 1956-1968, wrote several books, among them About Theater (О театре, 1962) and Not Just About Theater (Не только о театре, 1966), and was designated a People's Artist of the USSR in 1960.

Akimov was director of the New Theatre in Leningrad in the early 1950s.

The Saint Petersburg Comedy Theatre is named in his honour.

References

External links
Page of Nikolay Akimov on the site of Saint Petersburg Comedy Theatre

1901 births
1968 deaths
Artists from Kharkiv
Vkhutemas alumni
People's Artists of the RSFSR
People's Artists of the USSR
Recipients of the Order of the Red Banner of Labour
Recipients of the Order of the Red Star
Russian scenic designers
Soviet theatre directors
People from Saint Petersburg